Meeow! (Gaelic version: Meusaidh) is a 2000-2003 British animated children's series based on the Maisie MacKenzie books by Aileen Paterson, and produced simultaneously in English and Gaelic versions. The series is about a young cat named Maisie Mac who lives with her grandmother in Morningside in Edinburgh as her explorer father is always away.

Scottish Television in association with The Gaelic Committee, decided to make the book into a cartoon series, with Siriol Animation doing the animation. The stories were narrated by Scottish comedian Stanley Baxter (English version) and by actor Tony Kearney (Gaelic), and the theme music (both versions) was produced by The Singing Kettle. Its first run was featured on ITV children's block, CITV.

The programme was re-aired in 2009 on wknd@stv - a children's television strand on Scottish television channel, STV. The Gaelic version used to air on BBC Alba. From March 2015, the series airs as part of the "Weans' World" block on STV Glasgow and STV Edinburgh.

The rights of the show was owned by The Sleepy Kids Company Ltd (who also produced Potsworth & Co. and Budgie the Little Helicopter) which was later changed to SKD Media and Entertainment Rights, then dissolved into Classic Media (now DreamWorks Classics, in turn owned by DreamWorks Animation, a subsidiary of NBCUniversal) and later became the property of Universal Television in 2016.

Characters
Maisie "Maisie Mac" MacKenzie - A young Scottish cat who wishes to be an explorer like her father.
Granny/Isabella MacKenzie - Maisie's grandmother. She looks after Maisie whilst Daddy is away.
Mrs. Marjorie McKitty - Maisie and Granny's neighbour.
Archie - Maisie's best friend.
Lydia McSporran - Mrs McKitty's niece.
Daddy - Maisie's father who travels the world as part of his job as a professor at the University of Edinburgh.
Maureen and Doreen Purrdy - Maisie's twin friends from her ballet class.
Tommy and Morag McTwirl - two snooty senior dancers from Maisie's ballet class.

Episodes

References

External links
 http://www.toonhound.com/meeow.htm
Meeow! on STV Player

2000s British animated television series
2000s British children's television series
2000s Scottish television series
2000 British television series debuts
2002 British television series endings
BBC Alba shows
British children's animated television shows
British preschool education television series
Animated preschool education television series
2000s preschool education television series
DreamWorks Classics
English-language television shows
ITV children's television shows
Scottish television shows
Television shows produced by Scottish Television
Television shows set in Edinburgh
Animated television series about cats
Animated television series about children